Houverath may refer to villages in the German state of North Rhine-Westphalia:

 Houverath (Bad Münstereifel), village in the borough of Bad Münstereifel, county of Euskirchen
 Houverath (Erkelenz), village in the borough of Erkelenz, county of Heinsberg